The Permanent Representative of Greece to the United Nations is the Permanent Representative of the Greek government to the Headquarters of the United Nations in New York City.

References

United Nations New York
 
Greece